KFXL-TV (channel 51) is television station licensed to Lincoln, Nebraska, United States, serving as the Fox affiliate for southeastern and central Nebraska, including Hastings, Kearney and Grand Island. The station is owned by the Sinclair Broadcast Group alongside Kearney-licensed KHGI-TV (channel 13), the ABC affiliate for the western portion of the Lincoln–Hastings–Kearney market. KFXL-TV's transmitter is located on Yankee Hill Road in southeast Lincoln. Its main signal is simulcast on the digital subchannels of most of the KHGI/NTV network stations, bringing KFXL programming to the western half of the Lincoln–Hastings–Kearney market and parts of the North Platte market.

History
KFXL signed on June 26, 2006, as KOWH, an affiliate of The WB Television Network. The station was originally owned by the Omaha World-Herald, from which KOWH derived its call sign. The newspaper outsourced most of the station's operations to Pappas Telecasting, which provided marketing, sales and programming services to the station. Before KOWH signed on, The WB was seen either via another Pappas-operated station, KXVO in Omaha, or a cable-only WB 100+ station, KWBL; KOWH took KWBL's place on cable systems in central Nebraska, including Charter Communications in Hastings, Grand Island, and Kearney. Like KWBL, KOWH was a straight simulcast of The WB 100+, with no live programming.

Five months before KOWH's sign-on, The WB and UPN announced that they would close and form The CW Television Network. Pappas had obtained the affiliation for KOWH by the time it signed on, and to reflect this affiliation, the station changed its callsign to KCWL-TV on August 2, 2006. KCWL operated as a member of The CW Plus, successor of The WB 100+. On September 1, 2006, KCWL was added to the primary cable system in Lincoln, Time Warner Cable, on channel 18 in their low basic cable tier.

Because it was granted an original construction permit after the Federal Communications Commission (FCC) finalized the DTV allotment plan on April 21, 1997, the station did not receive a companion digital channel. It was thus required to flash-cut to a digital signal when analog broadcasting formally ended on June 12, 2009.

However, on June 3, 2009, Pappas Telecasting announced that KCWL would drop its CW affiliation upon the shutdown of the analog transmitter, leaving the Lincoln–Hastings–Kearney market without an over-the-air CW station. The station turned off its analog signal on June 9. When it returned as a digital-only station on June 12, it did so as Fox affiliate KFXL-TV, airing the same programming as KTVG-TV (channel 17) and KSNB-TV (channel 4). Previously, Lincoln cable systems piped in Omaha Fox affiliate KPTM, which included Lincoln in its station ID. KTVG also operated two analog translators in Lincoln. Steve Harry, general manager of NTV/KFXL, stated that the move was made to increase viewership of his station due to most viewers in Lincoln choosing KXVO, which TWC had continued to carry, for CW programming. Harry stated that as a Fox affiliate, KFXL would be in a better position to increase viewership in Lincoln due to the stronger signal, boosting its status as the city's default Fox station rather than KPTM. Another likely factor was KSNB's sharply reduced coverage area in digital; it had opted to return its digital broadcasts to channel 4 after previously airing digitally on channel 34, and lower VHF frequencies do not carry very well in digital. KFXL was potentially able to make up for the shortfall in KSNB's coverage.

For approximately two months, KFXL operated as a full-power repeater of KTVG under the moniker "Fox 4 and 17" (in reference to the channel numbers for KSNB and KTVG); later in summer 2009, the network was rebranded as "KFXL, Fox Nebraska", with KTVG and KSNB rebranded as satellites of KFXL.

The time brokerage agreement between Pappas Telecasting and Colins Broadcasting Corporation (the licensee of KSNB) expired without renewal on November 30, 2009. As a result, KSNB was removed from Fox Nebraska and shut down on December 1, 2009. As of April 2010, KTVG-TV was no longer listed on KFXL ID screens. It was stated on a message board that parent station KHGI-TV announced during a newscast that KTVG-TV shut down on April 5, 2010; this was confirmed by a comment in the station's July DTV education quarterly activity report filed with the FCC. Until KTVG shut down, that station fed programming to KFXL and the network's low-power analog repeaters even though KFXL was billed as the main station. The digital subchannels of the NTV stations carrying KFXL received a direct feed from the studios in Axtell, as did KTVG.

On June 9, 2010, KFXL-TV was purchased from the Omaha World-Herald by T. Stanley Trapp of Visalia, California, in a $300,000 deal first reached in December 2006 but not approved until March 30, 2010. Trapp, in turn, agreed to sell the station to Pappas outright for $300,000 on October 30, 2014; in the filing with the FCC, Pappas stated that KFXL's signal does not significantly overlap the signal of KHGI-TV. The sale was completed on January 23, 2015. In August 2015, the liquidating trust for Pappas announced that it was soliciting bids for a bankruptcy auction of the company's Nebraska stations, which took place October 27, 2015. Of the four companies that participated in the auction, Sinclair Broadcast Group emerged as the winning bidder; on November 4, 2015, the company announced that it had agreed to acquire KFXL-TV, KHGI-TV, and KWNB-TV for $31.25 million. The sale was completed on May 1, 2016.

News operation
The station airs a 30-minute nightly newscast at 9 p.m. Central Time, entitled KFXL Nightly, produced and staffed by sister station KHGI-TV. KFXL Nightly began to be broadcast in HD on September 5, 2013, as part of KHGI's HD upgrade. KFXL also airs public service announcements and commercials in full 720p HD.

Technical information

Analog-to-digital conversion
KFXL-TV changed digital channels from RF 51 to RF 15 on November 12, 2014. The channel change was not announced except by station personnel responding to Facebook posts from viewers who had lost the signal unexpectedly. KFXL continues to use virtual channel 51 via PSIP technology. The channel change brought some confusion for viewers as channel 15 is also the virtual channel number of Omaha CW affiliate KXVO, which transmits on RF channel 38; on receivers that had already mapped virtual channel 15 to KXVO, it was necessary to perform a complete channel re-scan in order to detect KFXL. The channel change also brought a small power upgrade to 21,500 watts ERP.

On October 20, 2017, the tower on which KFXL leased space for their transmitter collapsed, leaving the station off the air in the Lincoln and eastern Nebraska area until January 11, 2018, when the station began transmitting from its current tower in southeast Lincoln.

High-definition programming
KSNB and KTVG began broadcasting network programming in high-definition on January 1, 2009, prior to the broadcast of the Orange Bowl.

KHGI-DT2, KWNB-DT2, and KWNB-LD2 all continue to carry Fox programming in high definition. KFXL-TV also began carrying high-definition programming in Spring 2012. On Dish Network and DirecTV, KHGI-DT2 is carried in high-definition and identified as KFXL.

Broadcast area

NTV digital subchannels
Since June 12, 2009, KFXL-TV has also been carried in high definition on the digital subcarriers of most of the stations in the KHGI/NTV network—KHGI-DT2 in Kearney; KWNB-DT2 in Hayes Center; and KWNB-LD2 in McCook. KFXL can also be seen in standard definition on the digital subcarrier of KHGP-LP, in O'Neill.

North Platte
The KWNB (Hayes Center) signal serves portions of the North Platte market, which puts KFXL in competition with that market's local Fox affiliate, KIIT-CD, which is seen on a low-power digital signal and on a subcarrier of KNOP-TV. In order to respect KIIT-CD's rights to Fox in North Platte, KFXL is not carried on NTV's North Platte transmitter, KHGI-CD.

Former KFXL repeaters
Two additional repeaters, K18CD and KWAZ-LP channel 35 in Lincoln, carried KFXL's programming (and that of KTVG prior to June 12, 2009) until December 1, 2009; both repeaters, as with KSNB, were owned by Colins Broadcasting Company. (A third Colins-owned translator, K17CI in Beatrice, had left the air on June 12, 2009.)

KFXL-TV was rebroadcast on KUVR-LD, channel 29, in McCook until mid-June 2009, when KUVR-LD became KWNB-LD and began rebroadcasting KWNB-TV (though as noted above, KFXL remains available on KWNB-LD via channel 6.2). KTVG-TV also once operated its own repeater in McCook, WCWH-LP channel 40; this was shut down in favor of KWNB-LD2 on March 19, 2010.

In addition, KFXL-TV (and KTVG before it) were carried on KHJP-LP, channel 29, in Valentine from 2004 to 2010. By spring 2010, Pappas had shut off both of its repeaters in Valentine (the other, WCWH-LP, had been a KHGI repeater) and by December had returned both licenses to the FCC.

Cable/satellite coverage
As the Fox affiliate for the Lincoln–Hastings–Kearney market, KFXL is found on nearly all cable systems in the south-central, southwest, central, and north-central parts of Nebraska.

KFXL is on Charter Spectrum channel 18 in Lincoln and Crete, channel 5 in Seward and David City, channel 2 in Fairbury and York, channel 4 in Beatrice, Minden, Cozad, Lexington, Gothenburg, Ord, Kearney and Grand Island, and channel 3 in Hastings. All of the Charter systems in the Lincoln–Hastings–Kearney market, except Beatrice, also carry the KFXL high-definition signal on a digital tier. Glenwood Communications carries KFXL on channel 17 in Blue Hill. Great Plains Cable Television customers in Hayes Center can find the station on basic channel 29, and in Broken Bow and McCook on channel 4. Three River Telco customers in O'Neill receive KFXL on channel 14, while customers in Ainsworth and Valentine receive KFXL on channel 4. In Thedford, KFXL is on Consolidated Cable channel 4.

On July 26, 2012, Time Warner Cable (which was purchased by Charter in 2016) dropped the KPTM HD signal from all of their cable headends within the Lincoln market, in favor of carrying only the KFXL HD signal.

Dish Network carries KFXL on local channels 17, 5163 and 7554 across the entire Lincoln–Hastings–Kearney DMA, and DirecTV carries KFXL on local channel 17. The 17 placement is carried over from KTVG, KFXL's predecessor.

During most of 2010, KFXL and KTVG-TV were duplicated on cable systems in southeast and south-central Nebraska; however, in August 2010, Time Warner Cable removed the duplicate channels in order to free up space in their lineup.

Former CW carriage
As CW affiliate KCWL, KFXL was carried as the market's local CW signal on cable systems that made room for the station. When the station switched to Fox programming in June 2009, cable systems that were already carrying Fox programming via KTVG opted to replace KCWL with the national CW Plus feed, though in the eastern end of the market (Lincoln area) cable systems continued to carry (or reverted to carrying) Omaha CW affiliate KXVO-TV as the local station. In addition, DirecTV replaced KCWL with KXVO as the local CW affiliate in its locals package across the entire Lincoln–Hastings–Kearney market area.

References

External links

Pappas Profile on KTVG
KTVG screen captures at Northpine.com

FXL-TV
Fox network affiliates
Television channels and stations established in 2006
2006 establishments in Nebraska
Sinclair Broadcast Group